The Eurofly Fox is an Italian ultralight aircraft that was designed and produced by Eurofly srl of Galliera Veneta. When it was available the aircraft was supplied as a complete ready-to-fly-aircraft or as a kit for amateur construction.

Design and development
The Fox features a strut-braced parasol wing, a two-seats-in-side-by-side configuration open cockpit with a windshield, fixed tricycle landing gear with wheel pants and a single engine in pusher configuration.

The aircraft is made from mixed steel and aluminum tubing, with its flying surfaces covered in Dacron sailcloth envelopes. Each wing is supported by two parallel struts with jury struts. The standard engine used is the  Rotax 503 two-stroke powerplant.

Variants
Basic Fox
Stripped down version with minimal options, designed as a trainer.

Specifications (Basic Fox)

References

Fox
1990s Italian sport aircraft
1990s Italian ultralight aircraft
Single-engined tractor aircraft
Parasol-wing aircraft
Homebuilt aircraft